The Office of the Secretary of State for Wales, informally known as the Wales Office (Swyddfa Cymru), is a department of His Majesty's Government. It replaced the former Welsh Office, which had extensive responsibility for governing Wales prior to Welsh devolution in 1999.

History 
In the past, the Office was called "Wales' voice in Westminster and Westminster's voice in Wales". However, it is significantly less powerful since the Government of Wales Act 2006: it is primarily responsible for carrying out the few functions remaining with the Secretary of State for Wales that have not been transferred already to the Senedd (Welsh Parliament); and for securing funds for Wales as part of the annual budgetary settlement.

The Secretary of State for Wales has overall responsibility for the office but it is located administratively within the Ministry of Justice (until 2007, the Department for Constitutional Affairs).

Ministers
The ministers in the Office of the Secretary of State for Wales are as follows:

Unlike Scotland and Northern Ireland, Wales does not have its own Law Officers of the Crown; it is part of the England and Wales legal jurisdiction. The Attorney General for England and Wales therefore advises the United Kingdom Government on its law. His deputy is the Solicitor General for England and Wales.

Future

Following the 'yes' vote in the 2011 referendum on giving the Assembly direct law-making powers, some politicians in Wales, particularly from Plaid Cymru, have called for the abolition of the Wales Office. Lord Elis-Thomas, Presiding Officer of the National Assembly for Wales said:

However, Lord Elis-Thomas was accused of following a "separatist agenda" by the Conservative Cheryl Gillan, then Secretary of State for Wales. She was supported by her Labour predecessor Peter Hain, who declared that Wales "still needs a voice around the Cabinet in Westminster".

References

External links 
 

Ministerial departments of the Government of the United Kingdom
Government of Wales
Politics of Wales
Organisations based in Cardiff
Government bodies based in London
1999 establishments in the United Kingdom